Jeremy Staunton (born 7 May 1980) is an Irish rugby union fly-half and Fullback, having retired in 2012 while playing for English club Leicester Tigers in the top level of English rugby, the English Premiership. He has also played at every level for Ireland.

He was educated at St Munchin's College Limerick and University of Limerick.

Staunton began his rugby career with his local team Galbally RFC in Co. Limerick, Ireland. Later, he played for Garryowen Football Club in the All-Ireland League before earning a contract with Munster in 1999, at the age of 19. He enjoyed five successful seasons with Munster, playing in both the fly-half and full back positions, helping Munster to win the Celtic League in February 2002. Seeing his opportunities limited behind Ronan O'Gara he joined Harlequins in the summer of 2004 before moving on to London Wasps in the summer of 2005.  He was part of the Wasps side that won the Powergen Anglo-Welsh cup in 2006, the Heineken Cup in 2007 and the English Premiership in 2008, beating Leicester. He then joined Leicester in the summer of 2009 where he proved a very successful signing and helped to win two further Aviva Premiership titles for the club, playing in the 2010 final, as well as the LV Cup in March 2012 shortly before his retirement.

Staunton earned his first Irish cap on 11 November 2001 against Samoa, scoring a try on his debut international appearance. He earned a further two caps on the Irish tour to Japan in 2005 and also toured New Zealand and Australia with Ireland in June 2006, earning another cap. In June 2007, prior to the Rugby World Cup, he started at Fly-half for Ireland on their tour of Argentina.

Staunton taught at Denstone College in 2015 but is now a teacher of Mathematics and Technical Graphics in Castleknock College co. Dublin.

References

External links
Munster Profile
St Munchin's College
Leicester Profile
London Irish profile
Wasps profile
Jeremy Staunton ercrugby profile
Jeremy Staunton RBS profile

1980 births
Living people
Irish rugby union players
Ireland international rugby union players
Rugby union fly-halves
Munster Rugby players
Garryowen Football Club players
Wasps RFC players
London Irish players
Harlequin F.C. players
Leicester Tigers players
People educated at St Munchin's College
Ireland Wolfhounds international rugby union players
Rugby union players from Limerick (city)
Irish expatriate rugby union players
Irish expatriate sportspeople in England
Expatriate rugby union players in England